Epiperipatus broadwayi is a species of velvet worm in the Peripatidae family. This species is dark brown with light brown triangles down its back. This species has 29 to 34 pairs of legs. The type locality is in Tobago.

References

Onychophorans of tropical America
Onychophoran species
Animals described in 1913